Frances Nutter-Upham is a New Hampshire politician.

Career
On November 6, 2018, Nutter-Upham was elected to the New Hampshire House of Representatives where she represents the Hillsborough 33 district. Nutter-Upham assumed office on December 5, 2018. Nutter-Upham is a Democrat. Nutter-Upham endorsed Bernie Sanders in the 2020 Democratic Party presidential primaries.

Personal life
Nutter-Upham resides in Nashua, New Hampshire. Nutter-Upham is married and has four children.

References

Living people
Women state legislators in New Hampshire
Politicians from Nashua, New Hampshire
Democratic Party members of the New Hampshire House of Representatives
21st-century American women politicians
21st-century American politicians
Year of birth missing (living people)